Saleh Ali Farrah is a former Member of Parliament in the National Assembly of Tanzania.

References

Tanzanian MPs 2005–2010
Living people
Tanzanian Muslims
Year of birth missing (living people)
Place of birth missing (living people)
21st-century Tanzanian politicians